Ukrainian names are given names that originated in Ukraine. In addition to the given names, Ukrainians also have patronymic and family names (surnames; see: Ukrainian surnames).

Ukrainian given names 
Diminutive and hypocoristic forms male names native to the Ukrainian language have either an empty inflexional suffix or the affixes -о, -ик. Female names have the affixes -ся, -йка, -нька,.

As in most cultures, a person has a given name chosen by parents. First names in East-Slavic languages mostly originate from one of three sources: Orthodox church tradition (which derives from sources of Greek origin), Catholic church tradition (of Latin origin), or native pre-Christian Slavic origins. Pre-Christian wishful names were given in the hope of controlling the fate
of the people. For instance, to scare away evil, children were given
names derived from dangerous predatory animals, while the names of Shchasny (Happy) or
Rozumnyk (Smart) was supposed to make them happy or smart respectively.

Most names have several diminutive forms.

Popular Ukrainian male given names 

  (Albert ), from Albert, of Germanic origin.
  (Anatolii), from Anatolius, of Greek origin.
  (Andrii ), equivalent to Andrew, of Greek origin.
  (Anton ),  (Antin ), equivalent to Anthony, of Latin origin.
  (Arkadii ), from Arcadius, of Greek origin.
  (Arsen ),  (Arsenii ), from Arsenius, of Greek origin.
  (Artem ), equivalent to Artemius, of Greek origin.
  (Artur ), equivalent to Arthur, of Latin or Celtic origin.
  (Atanasii ),  (Panas ), from Athanasius, of Greek origin.
  (Bohdan ), of Slavic origin.
  (Bronislav ),  (Boronyslav ), of Slavic origin.
  (Vadym ), equivalent to Vadim, of Persian or Slavic origin.
  (Valentyn ), equivalent to Valentine, of Latin origin.
  (Valerii ), from Valerius, of Latin origin.
  (Vasyl ), equivalent to Basil, of Greek origin.
  (Viktor ), equivalent to Victor, of Latin origin.
  (Vitalii ).
  (Vladyslav ),  (Volodyslav ), a pre-Christian name of Slavic origin, meaning "lord of fame".
  (Vladlen), of Russian Communist origin (Vladimir Lenin). No longer used.
  (Volodymyr ), a pre-Christian name of Slavic origin, equivalent to Vladimir and Waldemar.
  (Vsevolod ), a pre-Christian name of Slavic origin.
  (Viacheslav ), equivalent to Wenceslaus, a pre-Christian name of Slavic origin.
  (Hennadii ),  (Henadii ), from Gennadius, of Greek origin.
  (Hryhorii ), equivalent to Gregory, of Greek origin.
  (Davyd ), from David, of Hebrew origin.
  (Danylo ), equivalent to Daniel, of Hebrew origin.
  (Demian ), equivalent to Damian, of Greek origin.
  (Denys ), equivalent to Dennis, of Greek origin.
  (Dmytro ), from Demetrius, of Greek origin.
  (Eduard), equivalent to Edward, of Anglo-Saxon origin.
  (Yevhen ),  (Yevhenii ), equivalent to Eugene, of Greek origin.
  (Zinovii ),  (Zenovii ), from Zenobius, of Greek origin.
  (Ivan ), equivalent to Ian, John and Sean, of Hebrew origin.
  (Ihor ), from Ingvar, of Varangian origin.
  (Illia ), equivalent to Elias and Elijah, of Hebrew origin.
  (Yosyp ),  (Yosyf ),  (Osyp ), equivalent to Joseph, of Hebrew origin.
  (Kazymyr ), equivalent to Casimir, of Slavic origin.
  (Kyrylo ), equivalent to Cyril, of Greek origin.
  (Kostiantyn ), equivalent to Constantine, of Latin origin.
  (Kuzma ), from Cosmas, of Greek origin.
  (Lev ), equivalent to Leo, of Greek origin.

  (Leonid ), from Leonidas, of Greek origin.
  (Leontii ), from Leontius, of Greek origin.
  (Liubomyr ), of Slavic origin.
  (Maksym ), from Maximus, of Latin origin, meaning "greatest".
  (Markiian), equivalent to Marcian, of Latin origin.
  (Marko ), equivalent to Marcus and Mark, of Latin origin.
  (Marian ), from Marianus, of Latin origin.
  (Matvii ), equivalent to Mathias and Matthew, of Hebrew origin.
  (Mykyta ), equivalent to Nikita, from Nicetas, of Greek origin.
  (Mykola ), equivalent to Nicholas, of Greek origin.
  (Myron ), of Greek origin.
  (Myroslav ), of Slavic origin.
  (Mykhailo ), equivalent to Michael and Mitchell, of Hebrew origin.
  (Nazar ),  (Nazarii ), from Nazarius, a Christian name of ambiguous linguistic origins.
  (Oleh ), equivalent to Helge, of Varangian origin.
  (Oleksandr ), equivalent to Alexander, of Greek origin.
  (Oleksii ),  (Oleksa ), equivalent to Alexis, of Greek origin.
  (Omelian ), from Aemilianus, of Latin origin.
  (Orest ), from Orestes, of Greek origin.
  (Ostap ),  (Yevstakhii ), equivalent to Eustace, of Greek origin.
  (Pavlo, equivalent to Paul, of Latin origin.
  (Petro ), equivalent to Peter, of Greek origin.
  (Pylyp ), equivalent to Philip, of Greek origin.
  (Roman ), of Latin origin.
  (Rostyslav ), of Slavic origin.
  (Ruslan ), equivalent to Arslan, of Tatar origin.
  (Sava ), of Slavic origin.
  (Sviatoslav ), a pre-Christian name of Slavic origin.
  (Semen), equivalent to Simeon, of Hebrew origin.
  (Serhii ), equivalent to Serge, of Latin origin.
  (Stanyslav ),  (Stanislav ), of Slavic origin.
  (Stepan ),  (Stefan ), equivalent to Stephen, of Greek origin.
  (Taras ), of Greek or Dacian origin.
  (Tymofii ), equivalent to Timothy, of Greek origin.
  (Tymur ), of Mongol or Turkic origin.
  (Trokhym ).
  (Fedir ),  (Fedor ),  (Teodor ),  (Khvedir ), equivalent to Theodore, of Greek origin.
  (Feodosii ), from Theodosius, of Greek origin.
  (Frants ), from Franz, equivalent to Francis, of Latin origin.
  (Yurii ),  (Heorhii ),  (Yehor ), equivalent to George, of Greek origin.
  (Yukhym ), from Euthymius, of Greek origin.
  (Yakiv ), equivalent to Jacob and James, of Hebrew origin.
  (Yaroslav ), of Slavic origin.

Popular Ukrainian female given names 

  (Alla ), of Gothic origin.
  (Anastasiia ), of Greek origin.
  (Anhelina ), from Angelina, of Greek origin.
  (Anzhela ), from Angela, of Greek origin.
  (Antonina ), of Latin origin.
  (Bronislava),  (Boronyslava), feminine of Bronislav and Boronyslav.
  (Valentyna ), from Valentina, feminine of Valentyn.
  (Varvara ), from Barbara, of Greek origin.
  (Vasylyna ), feminine of Vasyl.
  (Veronika ), from Veronica, a Latin alteration of Berenice, of Ancient Macedonian origin.
  (Viktoriia ), feminine of Viktor, from Victoria, of Latin origin.
  (Veselka), Ukrainian word , meaning "rainbow".
  (Vira ), meaning "faith", calque from Greek  (Piste).
  (Halyna ), from Galene, of Greek origin.
  (Hanna ),  (Anna ), equivalent to Anne, of Hebrew origin.
  (Daryna ), of Slavic origin.
  (Dariia ),  (Daria ), from Daria, of Persian origin.
  (Dina), from Dinah, of Hebrew origin.
  (Emiliia ), equivalent to Emily, of Latin origin.
  (Yeva ), equivalent to Eve, of Hebrew origin.
  (Yevdokiia ), from Eudocia, of Greek origin.
  (Yevheniia ),  (Yevhena), from Eugenia, feminine of Yevhen and Yevhenii, of Greek origin.
  (Yelyzaveta ),  (Yelizaveta ),  (Yelysaveta ), equivalent to Elizabeth and Isabella, of Hebrew origin.
  (Yefrosyniia ), from Euphrosyne, of Greek origin.
  (Zinaida ), from Zenaida, of Greek origin.
  (Zlata ), of Slavic origin.
  (Zoriana ), Slavic for "star", compare to Estelle (given name), Stella.
  (Zoia), from Zoe, of Greek origin.
  (Ivanna ),  (Zhanna),  (Yana ), equivalent to Jane, Jean, Joan, Joanna and Joanne, feminine of Ivan, of Hebrew origin.
  (Inna ).
  (Iryna ), equivalent to Irene, of Greek origin.
  (Kalyna), guelder-rose, symbol of Ukraine, the Ukrainian people.
  (Kateryna ), equivalent to Caitlin, Karen, Katherine, Kathleen and Katrina, of Greek origin.
  (Kvitka), Ukrainian , meaning "flower".
  (Klavdiia ), from Claudia, of Latin origin.
  (Larysa ).
  (Leonida ), feminine of Leonid.
  (Lidiia ), from Lydia, of Greek origin.
  (Liliia ).
  (Liubov ),  (Liubomyra ), feminine of Liubomyr, meaning "love", calque from Greek  (Agape).
  (Liudmyla ), equivalent to Ludmila, of Slavic origin.
  (Maia ), the month of May.

  (Marharyta ), equivalent to Margaret and Marjorie, of Persian origin.
  (Maryna ), from Marina, of Latin origin.
  (Mariia ), from Maria, equivalent to Marie, Mary and Miriam, of Hebrew origin.
  (Melaniia ), equivalent to Melanie, of Greek origin.
  (Myroslava ), feminine of Myroslav.
  (Mykhailyna ), feminine of Mykhaylo, equivalent to Michelle, of Hebrew origin.
  (Nadiia ), meaning "hope", calque from Greek  (Elpis).
  (Nataliia ),  (Natalia ), equivalent to Natalie, of Latin origin.
  (Nina ), from Nino, of ambiguous ancient Near Eastern origin.
  (Oksana ),  (Kseniia ), from Xenia, of Greek origin.  The form Oksana is most common.
  (Oleksandra ),  (Lesia ),  (Olesia ), feminine of Oleksandr, equivalent to Alexandra, of Greek origin.
  (Olena ), from Helena, equivalent to Elaine, Ellen and Helen, of Greek origin.
  (Olha ), feminine of Oleh, a pre-Christian name derived from Helga, of Varangian origin.
  (Paraskoviia ), from Paraskeve, of Greek origin.
  (Pelaheia),  (Pelahiia ), from Pelagia, of Greek origin.
  (Raisa ).
  (Romana), feminine of Roman.
  (Ruslana ), feminine of Ruslan.
  (Svitlana ), meaning "shining one", of Slavic origin.
  (Sviatoslava), feminine of Sviatoslav.
  (Snizhana ).
  (Solomiia ), equivalent to Salome, of Hebrew origin.
  (Sofiia ), from Sophia, equivalent to Sophie, of Greek origin.
  (Stefaniia ),  (Stepaniia),  (Stepanyda ), equivalent to Stephanie, masculine of Stefan and Stepan, of Greek origin.
  (Taisiia ),  (Taisa ), from Thaïs, of Greek origin.
  (Tamara), from Tamar, of Hebrew origin.
  (Teklia ), from Thecla, of Greek origin.
  (Tetiana ), of Latin origin.
  (Uliana ), equivalent to Gillian or Juliana, of Latin origin.
  (Fedora ), equivalent to Theodora, masculine of Fedir, Fedor, Khvedir and Teodor, of Greek origin.
  (Khrystyna ), equivalent to Christine, of Greek origin.
  (Yuliia ), equivalent to Julia and Julie, of Latin origin.
  (Yanina), diminutive of Yana, equivalent to Janine.
  (Yaroslava ), feminine of Yaroslav.

See also 
 Slavic names
 Slavic surnames
 Ukrainian surnames
 List of surnames in Ukraine

References

External links 
 List of popular names in Ukrainian (in Ukrainian)
 Database of Names - Main Department of Statistics in Lviv Oblast (in Ukrainian)

Names by culture
 
Ukrainian given names
Slavic-language names